Streblote dorsalis is a moth of the family Lasiocampidae first described by Francis Walker in 1866. It is found in India, Sri Lanka, the Philippines, Borneo, Indonesia and Java.

Description
As in most Lepidoptera, the female is larger than the male. The wingspan of the male is 60 mm and 75 mm in the female. Antennae fulvous, with the branches becoming abruptly short at middle in male, but short throughout in female. Body greyish white with dark reddish-brown tegulae. Abdomen reddish brown in each segment with greyish tinge. Legs are without spurs. Forewings dark reddish brown with a white spot at base. Hindwings dark reddish brown in males, and pale in females. Caterpillars are known to feed on Ziziphus mauritiana.

Subspecies
There are two subspecies.
 Streblote dorsalis dorsalis (Walker, 1866)
 Streblote dorsalis pallida (Rothschild, 1915)

References

Moths of Asia
Moths described in 1866